Crataegus kansuensis, the Gansu hawthorn, is a species of hawthorn found in China. They are shrubs or small trees, often very thorny. They prefer to grow in mixed forests, on shaded slopes and alongside streams, 1,000 to 3,000m above sea level.

References

kansuensis
Trees of China
Flora of North-Central China
Flora of South-Central China
Plants described in 1928